Lajos Czeizler (5 October 1893 – 6 May 1969) was a Hungarian footballer and coach. With 11 major titles altogether, he remains one of the most successful football coaches of all time.

Career
Czeizler was born in a Jewish family in Heves, Austria-Hungary. He played as goalkeeper with Vác in the Hungarian championship between 1921 and 1923.

He began his coaching career in the 1920s in Poland, in Łódzki Klub Sportowy, where he had between 1923 and 1926 his first coaching experience. After this he spent his first years in Italy, coaching the second division sides of Udinese and CA Faenza and from 1930 to 1931 the youth of S.S. Lazio.

From 1935 to 1936 he is coaching ŁKS again before moving to Sweden where his first engagement was in 1940 with Västerås SK. In the Between 1942 and 1948 he had his greatest successes with IFK Norrköping. There he achieved between 1943 and 1948 a record five championships and two national cups in 1943 and 1945. When he led Norrköping to the 1948 championship he became the oldest coach in Sweden to achieve this title. He was then aged 54 years, 8 months and 1 day. The record has since been lost to trainer Conny Karlsson with Helsingborgs IF.

After his time in Sweden he returned to Italy where he led A.C. Milan in 1951 to championship honours and a win in the Latin Cup, an annual tournament of the best teams from France, Spain, Portugal and Italy – an important contest in the absence of any other European competition. He coached the Italy national team in the 1954 FIFA World Cup. In the season 1961 he coached Fiorentina until January, and later, in June, this club won the Coppa Italia, defeating Lazio 2–0 in the final.

In the 1963–64 season he took S.L. Benfica to their fourth double of championship and cup of Portugal, and set a club record of 103 goals in 26 league matches.

Honours
IFK Norrköping
 Allsvenskan: 1942–43, 1944–45, 1945–46, 1946–47, 1947–48
 Svenska Cupen: 1943, 1945

Milan
 Serie A: 1951
 Latin Cup: 1951

Benfica
 Primeira Liga: 1963–64
 Taça de Portugal: 1963–64

References

1893 births
1969 deaths
People from Heves
Sportspeople from Heves County
Hungarian Jews
Jewish footballers
Hungarian footballers
Association football goalkeepers
Hungarian football managers
ŁKS Łódź managers
Udinese Calcio managers
S.S. Lazio managers
A.C. Milan managers
Calcio Padova managers
U.C. Sampdoria managers
ACF Fiorentina managers
Serie A managers
Italy national football team managers
1954 FIFA World Cup managers
Västerås SK Fotboll managers
IFK Norrköping managers
Hungarian expatriate footballers
Hungarian expatriate sportspeople in Italy
Expatriate football managers in Italy
Hungarian expatriate sportspeople in Portugal
Expatriate football managers in Portugal
Hungarian expatriate sportspeople in Sweden
Expatriate football managers in Sweden